Palistin (or Walistin), was an early Syro-Hittite kingdom located in what is now northwestern Syria and the southeastern Turkish province of Hatay. Its existence was confirmed by the discovery of several inscriptions mentioning Taita, king of Palistin.

History
Palistin was one of the Syro-Hittite states that emerged in Syria after the Late Bronze Age collapse. 

It dates to at least the 11th century BC and is known primarily through the inscriptions of its king Taita and his wife. The kingdom emerged some time soon after the collapse of the Hittite Empire, of which it is one of the successor states, and it encompassed a relatively extensive area, stretching at least from the Amouq Valley in the west, to Aleppo in the east, down to Mhardeh and Shaizar in the south. Prof. Itamar Singer proposes that it was the predecessor state that, once it disintegrated, gave birth to the kingdoms of Hamath, Bit Agusi and Pattin (shortened form of Palistin).

Archaeological evidence
The excavations at Tell Tayinat in the Turkish Hatay province which might have been the capital of Palistin, revealed two settlements, the first being a Bronze Age Aegean farming community, and the second an Iron Age Syro-Hittite city built on top of the Aegean farming settlement. Palistin is attested as Walistin in an inscription discovered in 1936 at the site.

Palistin ("Watasatina") is also attested in the Sheizar Stele, which is the funerary monument of Queen Kupapiya, the wife of Taita. Another stele, discovered in Meharde, might well be the funerary monument of King Taita. Both stelae mention the name of Taita, and invoke a "divine Queen of the Land", possibly the goddess Kubaba. Most importantly, in 2003 a statue of King Taita bearing his inscription in Luwian was discovered during excavations conducted by German archeologist Kay Kohlmeyer in the Citadel of Aleppo.

Possible link to Philistines
While Hittitologist John David Hawkins initially gave two transcriptions of the Aleppo inscriptions, Wadasatini and Padasatini, a later reading suggests a third possible interpretation: Palistin. The similarity between Palistin and names for the Philistines, such as the Ancient Egyptian Peleset and the Hebrew פְּלִשְׁתִּים Plištim, have led archaeologists Benjamin Sass, and Kay Kohlmeyer to hypothesize a connection. It has even been suggested, for instance, that the area around Kunulua (Calno; Tell Tayinat) may even have been part of a Philistine urheimat.

Gershon Galil suggests that King David halted the Arameans’ expansion into the Land of Israel on account of his alliance with the southern Philistine kings, as well as with Toi, king of Ḥamath (mentioned in the Bible), who is identified with Taita II, king of Palistin (the northern Sea Peoples).

According to Galil, there are now eight inscriptions recently discovered at different sites indicating that a large kingdom named Palistin existed in this area, which included the cities of Hamath, Aleppo and Carchemish.

The proposed Palistin-Philistines link remains controversial. According to Hittitologist Trevor Bryce, the connection between the biblical Philistines and the kingdom of Palistin remains a hypothesis and further excavations are needed to establish such a connection. The Shaizar and Meharde inscriptions apparently preserve the ethnonym Walistin and there is no clear explanation for the alternation between a character signifying Wa- in the Shaizar and Meharde inscriptions and one signifying Pa- in the Aleppo inscriptions.

If it was the case – as has been proposed by some theories concerning the Sea Peoples – that they originated in the Aegean area, there is no evidence from the Syro-Hittite artefacts at Tell Tayinat, either pictorial nor philological, to indicate a link to known Aegean civilizations. On the contrary, most of the discoveries at Tell Tayinat indicate a typical Luwian state. To cite two examples: firstly, the Syro-Hittite inhabitants used predominantly red slipped burnished ware, which is totally different from the Aegean-type pottery used by the early farming inhabitants. And secondly, the names of the kings of Palistin and the kings of the successor state of Pattin are also Hittite, even though there is no evidence of a direct link between Taita and the old Hittite royal house. It has since been proposed, based on material evidence and epigraphical parallels, that some Philistines did in fact settle in Kinalua, living alongside the indigenous inhabitants before assimilating into the Luwian population of what became a typical Neo-Hittite state in all but its name, which was all that remained of the Early Iron Age Sea Peoples settlers.

See also
Ancient regions of Anatolia

Citations

External links
Upper part of the Mhardeh stele
Lower part of the Mhardeh stele

Aramean states
Syro-Hittite states
Former kingdoms